A winter storm watch is issued by the National Weather Service of the United States when there is a possibility of heavy snow or potential of significant ice accumulations, without meeting a specific other winter criteria.  The watch is typically issued 12 to 48 hours before the storm's expected arrival in the given area.  The criteria for this watch can vary from place to place, which is true with other winter weather warning and advisories.

As the event of the storm draws nearer in time and confidence in the occurrence of significant winter weather conditions and accumulation is increased, the weather watch will be upgraded to a winter storm warning or blizzard warning, depending on whether blizzard conditions will be met. If there is considerable confidence in significant ice accumulations with little to no snow, the watch will be upgraded to an ice storm warning. When confidence increases in the occurrence of winter like conditions that are not expected to reach warning or other winter criteria, a winter weather advisory will be issued instead. A watch could be discontinued altogether if neither warning nor advisory-level conditions are expected to be met and when the possibility of a winter storms fade. Generally, a watch is not issued when only advisory-level conditions are expected. Watches generally go into effect when the chance of meeting warning criteria ranges from 50% to 80% of snow.

Example of a winter storm watch
095 
WWUS43 KMPX 030922
WSWLOT

URGENT - WINTER WEATHER MESSAGE
NATIONAL WEATHER SERVICE Twin Cites/Chanhassen
322 AM CST Wed Feb 28 2021

...SNOW AND BLOWING EXPECTED THURSDAY WITH SOME POTENTIAL  
FOR BLIZZARD CONDITIONS ALSO ACROSS SOUTH CENTRAL MINNESOTA

 Rain, snow, and possibly some freezing rainwill develop late
tonight, mostly across southern and eastern Minnesota into
western Wisconsin. A cold front will pass through Thursday morning
with temperatures falling from the low to mid 30s to the teens in
the afternoon. Precipitation will become widespread and turn to
snow quickly early Thursday morning following the cold front. Snow
will end from west to east in the afternoon and early evening.
Total snow accumulations of 3 to 6 inches are expected across
south central Minnesota into west central Wisconsin, with the
highest totals of around 6 inches along and east of a line from
Eau Claire to Ladysmith.

In addition to the snow, strong northwest winds with gusts of 35
to 45 mph are expected Thursday through early Thursday evening.
There is some potential for blizzard conditions across south
central Minnesota where the strongest gusts are likely to occur.
Much of this risk will depend on how much snow falls.

A Winter Storm Watch is in effect Thursday through Thursday
evening south and east of a line from St. James, to Mankato, Red
Wing, Eau Claire, and Ladysmith.

MNZ078-WIZ016-026>028-032100-
/O.NEW.KMPX.WS.A.0003.210204T1200Z-210205T0300Z/
Goodhue-Rusk-Pepin-Chippewa-Eau Claire-
Including the cities of Red Wing, Ladysmith, Durand,
Chippewa Falls, and Eau Claire
322 AM CST Wed Feb 3 2021

...WINTER STORM WATCH IN EFFECT FROM THURSDAY MORNING THROUGH
THURSDAY EVENING...

* WHAT...Heavy snow possible. Total snow accumulations of 4 to 7
  inches possible. Winds could gust as high as 40 mph.

* WHERE...In Wisconsin, Rusk, Pepin, Chippewa and Eau Claire
  Counties. In Minnesota, Goodhue County.

* WHEN...From Thursday morning through Thursday evening.
* IMPACTS...Plan on slippery road conditions. Patchy blowing snow
  could significantly reduce visibility. The hazardous conditions
  could impact the morning or evening commute.

PRECAUTIONARY/PREPAREDNESS ACTIONS...

Monitor the latest forecasts for updates on this situation.

&&

$$

MNZ077-082>085-091>093-032100-
/O.NEW.KMPX.WS.A.0003.210204T1200Z-210205T0300Z/
Rice-Watonwan-Blue Earth-Waseca-Steele-Martin-Faribault-Freeborn-
Including the cities of Faribault, St James, Mankato, Waseca,
Owatonna, Fairmont, Blue Earth, and Albert Lea
322 AM CST Wed Feb 3 2021

...WINTER STORM WATCH IN EFFECT FROM THURSDAY MORNING THROUGH
THURSDAY EVENING...

* WHAT...Blizzard conditions possible. Total snow accumulations
  around 3 inches possible. Winds could gust as high as 45 mph.

* WHERE...Portions of south central Minnesota.
* WHEN...From Thursday morning through Thursday evening.
* IMPACTS...Plan on slippery road conditions. Areas of blowing
  snow could significantly reduce visibility. The hazardous
  conditions could impact the morning or evening commute.

PRECAUTIONARY/PREPAREDNESS ACTIONS...

Prepare for possible blizzard conditions. Continue to monitor the
latest forecasts for updates on this situation.

&&

$$

Borghoff

See also
 Severe weather terminology (United States)

References

External links
 National Weather Service
 Federal Emergency Management Agency
 Meteorological Service of Canada
 

Weather warnings and advisories